Stephen Elboz (born 1956) is the writer of the children's books The Byzantium Bazaar and A Land without Magic.

Background 
Born in 1956 in Wellingborough, Northants, England, where he still lives, Elboz wrote his first novel in secret at his junior school in Wellingborough.

Encouragement from teachers made him continue to write, although he only left school with only a single O-Level in technical drawing. Later educated at Lancaster University, he won a writing competition and had a play produced on the local radio station.

Elboz was awarded the Smarties Young Judges' Prize for his first published novel, The House of Rats.

Books 
 The House of Rats 
 The Games Board Map 
 Bottle Boy 
 The Byzantium Bazaar 
 Ghostlands 
 A Handful of Magic 
 A Land Without Magic 
 A Wild Kind of Magic 
 An Ocean of Magic 
 Temmi and the Frost Dragon 
 The Tower at Moonville

References 

Living people
People from Wellingborough
Alumni of Lancaster University
English children's writers
1956 births